Koigi was a rural municipality of Estonia, in Järva County. It had a population of 1,177 (as of 2004) and an area of 204.45 km².

Villages
Huuksi - Kahala - Keri - Koigi - Lähevere - Prandi - Päinurme - Pätsavere - Rutikvere - Silmsi - Sõrandu - Tamsi - Vaali - Väike-Kareda - Ülejõe.

See also
Nurmsi Airfield

References

 
Populated places in Järva County